Saint Stephen's College (SSC) is a co-educational, Preparatory to Year 12 independent school, located in Coomera, a suburb on the Gold Coast of Queensland, Australia.

Notable alumni
 Scott McLaughlin, a New Zealand racing car driver.
 Monika Wejnert, a former professional tennis player.

References

Schools in Queensland